A Shan Tseng Tau or simply Tseng Tau is a village in the Plover Cove area of Tai Po District, Hong Kong.

Administration
Tseng Tau, including A Shan and Tung Tsz, is a recognized village under the New Territories Small House Policy.

History
At the time of the 1911 census, the population of Tseng Tau was 48. The number of males was 21.

References

External links
 Delineation of area of existing village Tseng Tau (Tai Po) for election of resident representative (2019 to 2022)

Villages in Tai Po District, Hong Kong